Daniel J. Travanti (born Danielo Giovanni Travanti; March 7, 1940) is an American actor. He is best known for playing police captain Frank Furillo in the television drama series Hill Street Blues (1981–1987) for which he received a Golden Globe Award and two consecutive Primetime Emmy Awards from many nominations.

Biography
Travanti, one of five children, was born in Kenosha, Wisconsin, to Italian immigrant parents John and Elvira Travanti. His father worked at the American Motors assembly plant in that city. He attended Mary D. Bradford High School, where he was an all-star football player; he received athletic scholarship offers to several colleges, but decided he wanted to be an actor rather than an athlete. A good student, he was offered scholarships to Harvard University, Princeton University, and the Alfred P. Sloan Scholarship to Dartmouth College, although he eventually took the General Motors Scholarship to attend the University of Wisconsin–Madison, from which he graduated Phi Beta Kappa in 1961. After that, he attended the Yale School of Drama on a Woodrow Wilson fellowship. In 1978, he graduated from Loyola Marymount University with a master's degree in English.

His first credited role was in an episode of Route 66 called "Child of a Night". In 1964, Travanti guest-starred in the episode "Murder by Scandal" of CBS's drama about newspapers, The Reporter. He made his feature film debut in 1965 (credited as "Dan Travanty") playing a deaf mute nightclub bouncer in the psychological thriller Who Killed Teddy Bear? starring Sal Mineo and Juliet Prowse.

In 1966, he played the role of radio talk show host and murderer Barney Austin in the Perry Mason episode "The Case of the Midnight Howler". He (credited as Dan Travanty in all four) was the lead guest star in the Season 3 episode "Collision of Planets" of Lost in Space in 1967, appeared in the episode "The Octopus" of the single-season crime drama The Silent Force in late 1970, was featured in the Season 5 episode "Murder Times Three" of Mannix in late 1971, and appeared in the Season 6 episode "Image" of Mission: Impossible in early 1972. Also in 1972, he played a fugitive in the episode "The Devil's Playground" of Cannon with future Hill Street co-star James B. Sikking. In 1974, Travanti appeared briefly in The Bob Newhart Show episode "The Battle of the Groups". Also in 1974, he appeared in a Gunsmoke episode, "Like Old Times", with his future Hill Street co-star Charles Haid.

Travanti earned five nominations and two Emmy Awards for his portrayal of Hill Street Station Captain Frank Furillo. In 1982, Boston's Emerson College chose him as the commencement speaker and gave him an honorary Doctorate degree. In 1983, Travanti starred in the TV movie Adam, for which he received another Emmy nomination. Since then, Travanti has appeared in a number of TV movies and has made appearances in television programs such as Poltergeist: The Legacy (1997) and Prison Break (2005). In 1986, HBO broadcast the made-for-cable biographical film Murrow, with Travanti's portrayal of Edward R. Murrow receiving a Cable Ace nomination. He co-starred in the film Millennium (1989) and as Lt. Ray McAuliffe in the television series Missing Persons (1993).

Travanti has publicly acknowledged his past as an alcoholic who found sobriety through Alcoholics Anonymous, calling alcoholism a "disease of loneliness and secrecy". In 1981, he made such a confession to Rona Barrett in an interview on NBC and even recited, from memory, all of the organization's "Twelve Steps" on camera. Captain Furillo, his best-known character, was also a recovering alcoholic, and the character was shown multiple times taking part in AA meetings.

From January to March 2007, Travanti appeared off-Broadway in Oren Safdie's The Last Word... at the Theater at St. Clements in New York City, and from November to December 2008, Travanti played the "Con Melody" in an off-off Broadway production of Eugene O'Neill's A Touch of the Poet for Friendly Fire Theater in New York.

In 2010, he appeared in an episode of Criminal Minds as a 75-year-old serial killer with Alzheimer's disease.

Travanti had a recurring role on the Starz television series Boss. He also appeared on The Twilight Zone Radio Dramas as Captain William Fletcher in the audio adaptation of "The Little People".

In 2017, he played Callen's father in NCIS: Los Angeles.

Filmography
Many of Travanti's roles prior to the mid-1970s were credited as "Dan Travanty" or "Dan Travanti." Later roles are credited as "Daniel J. Travanti."

Film

Television

References

External links
 
 
 The Last Word... 
 WOR radio interview
 Daniel J. Travanti interview at Archive of American Television - October 13, 2004

1940 births
Male actors from Wisconsin
American male film actors
American male television actors
American people of Italian descent
Best Drama Actor Golden Globe (television) winners
Outstanding Performance by a Lead Actor in a Drama Series Primetime Emmy Award winners
Living people
Actors from Kenosha, Wisconsin
University of Wisconsin–Madison alumni
20th-century American male actors
21st-century American male actors
Mary D. Bradford High School alumni